The Malaysia United People's Party (MUPP) or Parti Bersatu Rakyat Malaysia (BERSAMA) is a political party in Malaysia. Originally known as United Democratic Sabah Peoples Power Party or Parti Demokratik Setiahati Kuasa Rakyat Bersatu Sabah (SETIA), it changed the name as such after it extends to Peninsular Malaysia on 23 March 2011.

General election results

References

Conservative parties in Malaysia
Political parties in Malaysia
Political parties established in 2011
2011 establishments in Malaysia